TRMA may refer to:

 tRNA (uracil-5-)-methyltransferase, an enzyme
 Thiamine responsive megaloblastic anemia